Bruno Meyer may refer to:

 Bruno Meyer (born 1938), Swiss evangelical fundamentalist
 Bruno Meyer (pilot) (1915–1974), German fighter pilot, recipient of the Knight's Cross of the Iron Cross
Bruno Meyere, voice actor on Planzet